FC Schalke 04 is a German football club based in Gelsenkirchen, North Rhine-Westphalia.

Key 

Pld = Matches played
W = Matches won
D = Matches drawn
L = Matches lost
Pts = Points

NH = Not held
QR = Qualifying Round
GS = Group stage
R1 = Round 1
R2 = Round 2
R3 = Round 3

R4 = Round 4
R32 = Round of 32
R16 = Round of 16
QF = Quarter-finals 
SF = Semi-finals
F = Final

Top scorer shown in bold when he was also the league's highest or joint highest scorer.

Early years (until 1933)

Gauliga era (1933–1945)

Oberliga era (1945–1963) 
Key
OL = Oberliga West, LL = Landesliga Westfalen Gruppe 1 
EC = European Cup

Bundesliga era (1963–present) 
Key
BL = Bundesliga, 2BL = 2. Bundesliga 
CL = Champions League, EL = Europa League, CWC = Cup Winners' Cup, UC = UEFA Cup, IC = Intertoto Cup 
LP = Ligapokal, SC = Supercup

References 
 FC Schalke 04 at Fußballdaten.de (in German)
 FC Schalke 04 at worldfootball.net

Seasons
Schalke 04
Schalke 04
Schalke 04